The Walleralm is an alp with a mountain inn (Berggasthaus) that lies at a height of  above sea level at the foot of the Zettenkaiserkopf, a fore peak of the Zettenkaiser in the Austrian state of Tyrol. The alp is easily and quickly reached by mountain bike or on foot from Lake Hinterstein near Scheffau am Wilden Kaiser along a forest track. The alp has a panoramic view of the Kitzbüheler Horn mountain above the Hohe Salve and across to the Inn valley, in the distance the glaciers of the High Tauern are visible.

Facilities 
The Walleralm inn, run by the Eberwein family from Scheffau am Wilden Kaiser, lies at 1170 m in the Wilder Kaiser nature reserve and has overnighting accommodation for up to 20 people.
The alp and the inn are only managed during the summer months.

A few metres below the inn is the Stöffl Hut which is also open to visitors in the summer.

External links
 Walleralm website

Mountain huts in Tyrol (state)
Kaiser Mountains